is a Japanese manga series written and illustrated by Akihiro Ito. It was serialized in Shōnen Gahōsha's seinen manga magazine Young King OURs from 1993 to 2009, before entering on hiatus. Its chapters were collected in sixteen tankōbon volumes. A three-episode original video animation (OVA) adaptation, subtitled Get Back the Kitty, was released in 1998, followed by another OVA, subtitled Breakthrough, released from 2000 to 2001. In North America, the manga and the OVAs were formerly licensed by Central Park Media.

Plot
Ayagane City has a phantom cat (also called "bake neko" and "were-cat") problem. A young and overzealous group of entrepreneurs called Kagura Total Security can be hired to combat this problem for the right price when Hound, the official government arm, isn't enough. However, there are plots and subplots floating beneath the surface, both involving Kagura, and the were-cats, led by Kuro-Neko, themselves. Both the manga and the OVAs are heavily action-driven, with gunfights appearing every few chapters.

Characters

 Looking younger than she really is, Yuka, CEO of  comes across as a flighty, childish girl. However, commenting on having seen a TV show that had aired in Japan in the late 70s, she accidentally dates herself as being at least 20 years old. Her primary weapon is a crossbow, and she usually wears tight-fitting clothing and a bandanna. In flashbacks, she is revealed to have worked under the name "Rika Kikushima" in Kagura Co. ver. 3 along with her real-life older sister, Yuma, and Luger Ryuu. At the end of volume 16, she assists Yuma in setting up Kagura Co. ver. 5.

 Maki considers herself to be the "mysterious gun person," of the cast, often quoting from Akira Kobayashi and Keiichiro Akagi films. She is a firearm expert, and her favorite pistol is a Colt revolver, although she is also an excellent sniper. As a high school girl, she had fallen in love with "Luger" Ryuu and trained under him to become a marksman. In the underworld, she is known as "Crimson Shooting Star", and is either the fastest, or second fastest draw after Ryuu. She is last seen in volume 16 when fighting members of Irie's black ops squad.

 Eiko is the more elegant, sophisticated member of Kagura Co. She handles financing, accounting and day-to-day operations. She is also a master hand-to-hand fighter, preferring to use a pair of brass knuckles. She has one known nephew, Yuuki. In volume 9 she is shown to have extra-bushy eyebrows that need to be plucked constantly, and a dangerous pyromaniac streak, threatening to burn down everything when she gets impatient. She mentions at one point that she came to Kagura to avoid office sexual harassment. Last seen in volume 16, when the Kagura offices are blown up.

 Cute, short and with glasses, Takami is the primary computer hacker, working with Yuka to upgrade the containment software system. She uses rollerblades to get around at speeds close to 30 miles an hour (rivaling the speeds of cars on city streets), and favors butterfly knives with grenades attached. She gets her grenades from Maki is gun supplier. Is strongly attracted to Taba but too shy to come right out and say it, although she gets close in volume 11. She'll often collapse into a quivering pile when panicked. She is also an otaku, occasionally taking breaks from the company to help her friends produce doujinshii. Takami is last seen in the clutches of Irie's black ops group, being forced to delete all of the Kagura company servers.

 Yu is Kagura's primary driver, although that job will go to Taba if Yu is passed out or unavailable. She can steer anything with a wheel, but when not actually driving will fall heavily asleep. She mentions at one point that she sees herself as the wheel of a car—if she is not moving, then she is not accomplishing anything. In volume 3, she is shown to have one older brother and five sisters, who like to torment her when she is asleep. She is also a chain smoker, preferring "Lucky Strike Ultra Milds". Yu is last seen in volume 16 trying to drive away from Irie in an open jeep.

 Yoichi starts out as an unemployed salaryman responding to a job wanted ad from Kagura Co. Then, for the next several volumes, he focuses on trying to quit. He turns out to be a good strategist and capable with a crossbow and the Kagura protect seals. In volume 6, he states that his job is to do all of the falling for the other members. He becomes attracted to Ayumi Narusawa, the female sniper for Hound, and the two of them have sex in volume 15. Taba is asked by both Irie to join Hound, and by Kuro-Neko to act as a go-between for Kagura and the were-cats, although he turns down both of them. When he was about five years old, Taba had a pet kitten but was forced by his mother to abandon it at a nearby shrine. The kitten later turns out be Maya. Yoichi is the only surviving member of Kagura Co. ver. 4, other than Yuka, at the end of Part 2. He resurfaces three years later as a salaryman at a company that supplies Shin-Nihon Avionics and Zinguzi with third-party manifolds. At that time, he has a scar on his left ear from a bullet.

 Also known as Black Cat, KN is the informal leader of the were-cats trying to establish a safe place for them. He is always working in the shadows, wearing a trench coat and hat. He first appears on the CIA's radar as a "ghost spy" in the 1960s for his tendency to disappear quickly. He is connected to the defecting Russian spies Yuri Rastvorov and Viktor Belenko, and works to get his hands on a submarine and a nuclear warhead. He convinced Hiroyuki Kagura of the original Kagura Company to join forces with him against the Japanese government, and tries to do the same with Yoichi Taba. Eventually, though, his comrades turn against him because his plans are too slow and hard to understand, and he is forced to leave Ayagane City for a while. He returns later with about 20 young female were-cats trained in electronic espionage and "encourages" Taba to run for his life away from Hound. KN also likes to relax watching Trigun episodes on TV.

 A female were-cat, Maya looks like a young school girl in human form. Abandoned by Taba as a kitten, she was caught in a crossfire between Kuro-Neko and Kagura Co. ver. 3. Already miserable and near starving to death, she then took a couple of crossbow bolts from Rika Kikushima. KN told her to stand up for herself, and that is when she made the transition to were-cat. From that point, she became one of KN is assistants, turning into a spy against Kagura Co. ver. 4. But, she is still bonded to Taba, and becomes friends with most of the Kagura staff. She is capable of transferring over telephone lines, taking over computers and infiltrating guarded mansions. Generally she does not speak in human form, breaking character once to ask Maki and Eiko to save Taba. She is fiercely protective of Taba, and will sleep with him in kitten form. Maya likes "Genki Neko" ("happy cat", or "Lulu" in the U.S. version) brand cat food. She is last seen inside the containment system when Takami is forced to delete all the servers in volume 16.

 Also, possibly "Vashka". Vashuka is Kuro-Neko's right-hand woman, carrying out various tasks as required, such as slaughtering guards at the Shin-Nihon Avionics plant, or going to Russia to obtain a nuclear warhead. In human form she is a tall, thin, athletic woman with long wavy blond hair, usually wearing light-colored suits and dark sunglasses. She is a vicious unarmed fighter and cool under pressure. Her name was given to her by Hiroyuki Kagura, who said that it was a popular name for cats in the U.S.S.R.

 Socks is a tall, blonde, gentle woman in human form that cares for kittens abandoned at the shrine near Taba's old apartment, and seems to have helped raise for Maya at some point. She gets captured by Hound early on in the series, but is released after her memories have been wiped and attempts to kill both Maya and Taba. She is finally defeated by Taki.

 A scruffy guy with glasses in human form, Taki initially is one of KN's minions, carrying out various armed assaults against humans. He does switch over to the anti-KN faction after becoming disillusioned, but when one of the anti-KN assassins tries to kill Taba, he leaves them as well. Taki had been one of the abandoned cats that Socks had given Maya to care for, and he is bonded to Maya as a result, and to Taba by association.

 Yajima is the typical grizzled veteran combat leader with the buzz cut and lean, muscled body. Equally at home flying a helicopter as when launching a TOW. When not in the battlefield, he is shown living in the Hounds barracks.

 Yoda is a big, beefy guy with a scraggly mustache. He is often seen leading his men into various fights, or when arguing with Yuka Kikushima over who is getting into whose way. Like Yajima, Yoda apparently lives in the Hounds barracks and has no personal life outside it.

 Ayumi is the only woman shown within the otherwise all-male forces. She is medium height, trim, with long black hair. Initially, she is very clumsy and does poorly in calisthenics. After meeting Taba and going on a couple of dates, she gains confidence and turns into a master-class sniper. She also lives within the Hounds grounds and has little personal life outside it. However, she apparently does has an off-premises apartment. She falls in love with Taba and they do have sex in volume 15. In vol. 16 she is shown secretly providing covering fire for Taba as he runs for his life from Irie's black ops squad.

 Older daughter of Hiroyuki Kagura and Chieko Kikushima. Tall, thin, dark haired, and a big fan of horror novels, Yuma is the secret leader of Dept. 2, and the person that determines the fate of each instance of Kagura Company. She gives Irie his marching orders, and has been known to supply Yuka with newer versions of the containment software. She and Rika (i.e., Yuka) were members of Kagura Co. ver. 3, along with Luger Ryuu and two unnamed women. When Ryuu got too close to Kuro-Neko, Yuma had the two women killed, and told Ryuu to stay away from Maki once Umezaki joined ver. 4. When Ryuu broke that agreement, Yuma had the plane he was on blown up in mid-air. When Taba, Maki and Eiko discover the island that Chieko is still living on with a number of young female were-cats, Yuma orders the island bombed, and Kagura Co. ver. 4 to be framed for killing a cop and kidnapping a young girl (i.e., Maya). Yuma does allow Yuka to be a member of Kagura ver. 5 if she forgets everyone that she had been working with, and then focuses on deciding how to create the next variant of the company.

 As with all members of Dept. 2, "Irie" is a fake name. There have been two others before him that served his function of carrying out Yuma Kikushima's commands. In the first few volumes, he mostly just sits in a car and observes Hound, the were-cats and Kagura Co. for Yuma. Later, he commands the Hounds forces himself from a control center in the basement of the Ministry building, as well as calling up Yuka to hire Kagura Co. to assist in recovering the stolen Russian nuke. Finally, he and 4 other goons are the ones sent out to erase Kagura Co. ver. 4 for having reached the were-cat island and learning the truth of the Kagura secrets.

 A thin, dour-faced, reserved woman with black hair, Kotoi finds herself assigned to bodyguard Irie against an assassination commissioned by a Hounds manager that is tired of Irie's insubordination. After successfully protecting her assignment, and receiving several broken ribs because of it, Kotoi continues to follow Irie around from volumes 12 to 15. While she will not go against her orders, she does not hide the fact that she really does not like him.

Media

Manga
Written and illustrated by Akihiro Ito, Geobreeders started in Shōnen Gahōsha's seinen manga magazine Young King OURs in 1993. Its latest chapters was published on June 30, 2009, and the series has been on hiatus since. Shōnen Gahōsha has collected its chapters into individual tankōbon volumes. Sixteen volumes were released from May 24, 1995, to December 10, 2010.

In North America, the manga was licensed by CPM Manga, who only released the first five volumes from January 2000 to January 2003.

Original video animation

Another four-episode OVA, titled , was released from July 26, 2000, to March 23, 2001.

In North America, both OVAs were licensed by Central Park Media. The first OVA was released on May 16, 2000, and the second on August 13, 2002.

References

External links
 

1993 manga
1998 anime OVAs
2000 anime OVAs
2000 manga
Action anime and manga
Central Park Media
Comedy anime and manga
CPM Press
Works by Yōsuke Kuroda
Seinen manga
Shōnen Gahōsha manga